Desulfomonile is a Gram negative, strict anaerobe and non-motile bacterial genus from the family of Syntrophaceae. Desulfomonile bacteria can reduce sulfur oxyanions to H2S.

References

Further reading 
 
 
 

Bacteria genera
Thermodesulfobacteriota